Jagannath Govinda Temple
Location: Hojai Road, Gauranagar, Assam

Open At: 06.00AM Everyday

Close At: 06.00PM Everyday

A Hindu Religious Temple located in Southern Hojai.
 It was established in 1928.

www.facebook.com/jagannathgovindatemple

Hindu temples in Assam
Hojai district